USS Peosta—also known as "Tinclad" # 36—was a steamboat acquired by the Union Navy during the American Civil War. Peosta was outfitted as an armed gunboat, with heavy guns for battles at sea, and large howitzers for shore bombardment. She served on the rivers and other waterways of the Confederate States of America enforcing the Union blockade on the South.

Service history
Peosta, a side-wheel wooden gunboat, was built in 1857 at Cincinnati, Ohio, for civilian employment. She was purchased at Dubuque, Iowa, 13 June 1863; fitted out at Cairo, Illinois, and commissioned 2 October 1863, Lt. Thomas E. Smith in command. Assigned to the Naval forces on the Tennessee River, Peosta departed Cairo 28 October and arrived at Paducah, Kentucky, 3 November. Remaining on the Tennessee River throughout the Civil War, she cruised between Paducah and Eastport, Mississippi, to protect Union shipping and support Union Army activities. In the spring of 1864 she assisted in halting a Confederate land and river offensive against Paducah as they moved through Union lines to repossess defenses along the river. On 25 March 1864, she engaged Confederate troops at Paducah. Remaining on the Tennessee River into June 1865 she arrived at Mound City, Illinois, on the 5th for inactivation. On 7 August 1865 she decommissioned and 10 days later was sold to John W. Waggoner. She retained her name in postwar merchant service and burned at Memphis, Tennessee, on 25 December 1870.

See also 

 Anaconda Plan

References
  
 USS Peosta (1863-1865, "Tinclad" # 36)

Ships of the Union Navy
Ships built in Cincinnati
Steamships of the United States Navy
Gunboats of the United States Navy
American Civil War patrol vessels of the United States
1857 ships